Amory Hall (c. 1834 – c. 1888) was located on the corner of Washington Street and West Street in Boston, Massachusetts, in the 19th century. Myriad activities took place in the rental hall, including sermons; lectures by Henry David Thoreau, Ralph Waldo Emerson, William Lloyd Garrison; political meetings; exhibitions by Rembrandt Peale, George Catlin, John Banvard; moving panoramas; magic shows; concerts; and curiosities such as the "Nova Scotia Giant Boy."

Through the years, tenants included: First Free Congregational Church (c. 1836); Grace Church (1836);  artists Eastman Johnson, J.C. King, N. Southworth, T.T. Spear, William S. Tiffany (c.1847);  Oliver Stearns, retailer of artists' supplies (1849–1850); artists J.A. Codman, A. Ransom, and R.M. Staigg (c.1852).

In 1888, the hall was acquired by retailer William H. Zinn and incorporated into his "Connected Stores" occupying the block bounded by West and Washington Streets and Temple Place.

Events at Amory Hall 

 1834, November - Boston Mercantile Association Lectures
 1836 - Herr Schmidt "electrical, mechanical and physical experiments"
 1837, March - Dr. Graham delivered lectures "on marriage and courtship to audiences of women" "Great excitement at Amory Hall in consequence of an intended lecture to ladies, exclusively, on physical education. Many women were present, but so great was the tumult made by persons adverse to Graham and his lecture, that his object was defeated."
 1838 
 Physiological Society weekly lectures "on various subjects connected with the human constitution, health, the structure of the body, &c. ... Object, improvement in physiological knowledge."
 Aug. - George Catlin's Indian gallery "...will endeavour to entertain and instruct the citizens of Boston and its vicinity, for a short time with an exhibition of his paintings, costumes, &c."
 Oct. 10 - Whig Party meeting
 1839 - Lewis, Bartholomew & Co.'s "splendid dioramas ... the grand historical moving diorama of the Battle of Bunker Hill!! and conflagration of Charlestown
 1842
 Oct. 9 - James Freeman Clarke sermon on "the Sunday succeeding the death of William Ellery Channing"
 Nov. 24 - James Freeman Clarke lecture "Slavery in the United States"
 1844
 Feb. 4, 11 - William Lloyd Garrison lectures
 Feb. 18 - Charles Lane lectures
 Feb.25 - Adin Ballou lectures
 March 3 - Ralph Waldo Emerson's lecture "New England Reformers"
 March 10 - Henry David Thoreau lectures, "The Conservative and the Reformer"
 March 17 - Charles Dana lecture
 March 17 -  Joseph Rhodes Buchanan lecture
 March 24 - Ernestine Rose lecture
 March 31 - Wendell Phillips lecture
 March 31 - John Pierpont lecture
 April 21 - W.L. Garrison
 December - Eleventh Massachusetts Anti-Slavery Fair.
 1846 
 Rembrandt Peale's Court of Death
 Herr Alexander "experiments in natural philosophy and magic"
 1847 
 John Banvard
 George Brewer's panorama of the wonders and natural curiosities of the American continent. Fairmout Water works, & adjacent scenery ...  Mammoth Cave of Kentucky."
 Walter McPherson Bayne's "gigantic panoramic picture of a voyage to Europe! Comprises views of Boston, its harbor, the Atlantic, the River Mersey, Liverpool, London from the Thames, and both sides of the Rhine, painted from original sketches taken by the artist himself, constituting by far the largest panorama ever presented to the public, and which has been in preparation upwards of three years."
 1848 - Hine's "journey from Paris to Rome! over the Alps."
 1849
 April - Caleb Purrington and Benjamin Russell's "Panorama of a Whaling Voyage"
 William Burr's "seven mile mirror! the mammoth moving painting of the Great Lakes and rivers"
  Stockwell's colossal panorama of the upper and lower Mississippi rivers
 1850 - Brunetti's model of ancient Jerusalem, and Mr. Malone Raymond "with a descriptive lecture"
 1851
 January - Nova Scotia giant boy
 April - Miss Reynaldson. "Scotch melodies by this distinguished vocalist."
 1852 
 Exhibition of Edward A. Brackett's "marble group of the shipwrecked mother and child"
 May - "Immense attraction at Amory Hall. This fashionable place of resort is thronged every afternoon and evening, with crowds of those who wish to see the great panorama of California. Mr. Edward Wilson, the learned author of 'Sketches in the Mines' delivers an explanatory lecture."
 "The hall is now leased to the Handel and Haydn Society for every Sunday evening for 5 years; to the Musical Fund Society and to the Germanians for their concerts; also to the Mercantile Library Association for 30 evenings, and to the religious society of the Rev. Theodore Parker for the Sunday forenoons."
 1853 - Antonio "Signor" Blitz "scenes in ventriloquism and great magical illusions."
 1877 - Caroline Shawk Brooks, butter sculptor

References

Further reading

 Linck C. Johnson, "Reforming the Reformers: Emerson, Thoreau, and the Sunday Lectures at Amory Hall, Boston," ESQ: A Journal of the American Renaissance, 37 (4th Quarter 1991): 235-89.

Former buildings and structures in Boston
Financial District, Boston
History of Boston
19th century in Boston